Mehr or Mihr may refer to:

Persian names 
 Mehr, an alternative name for Mithra, a Zoroastrian divinity
 Mehr (month), the seventh month of the year and the sixteenth day of the month of the Iranian and Zoroastrian calendars
 Mehr's day, or Mehregan, the Zoroastrian/Iranian festival celebrated in honor of Mehr/Mithra

People 
 Mehr (name)
 Mihr (name)
 House of Mihran, a Parthian clan and an Armenian king

Places 
 Mehr, alternate spelling of Mohr, Fars, a city in Iran
 Kabud Mehr, a village in Iran
 Mehr, Ilam, a village in Ilam Province, Iran
 Mehr-e Olya, a village in Markazi Province, Iran
 Mehr-e Sofla, a village in Markazi Province, Iran
 Mehr, Razavi Khorasan, a village in Razavi Khorasan Province, Iran
 Mehrabad International Airport in Tehran
 Darb-e Mehr, Mithra's court, an alternate name for a Zoroastrian fire temple
 Mihrimah Mosque, an Ottoman mosque located just inside the Edirnekapı District on the Walls of Istanbul, Turkey
 Mihrimah Sultan Mosque (Üsküdar), an Ottoman mosque in the historic center of the Üsküdar municipality, Istanbul, Turkey
 Mihr, an Iranian village said to have once been the site of Adur Burzen-Mihr, one of the legendary Great Fires of Zoroastrianism
 Mihr's foot, another name for the Pamir Mountains
 Mehr, a district of Rees, Germany

Other
 Mehr News Agency (MNA), an Iranian news service established in 2003

See also
 Aryamehr, a secondary title of the former shah
 Mah (disambiguation)
 Mahr, a gift given by the husband to the wife in Muslim marriages
 Meher (disambiguation)
 Mer (disambiguation)
 Mehrdad, a Persian name
 Myrrh (disambiguation)